HMS Nonsuch was a 50-gun fourth rate ship of the line of the Royal Navy, built to the 1733 proposals of the 1719 Establishment at Rotherhithe, and launched on 29 December 1741.

Nonsuch served until 1766, when she was broken up.

Notes

References

Lavery, Brian (2003) The Ship of the Line - Volume 1: The development of the battlefleet 1650-1850. Conway Maritime Press. .

External links
 

Ships of the line of the Royal Navy
1741 ships